Perfect Life is a Spanish comedy television series, created by Leticia Dolera for Movistar+. The first season was fully released on the latter platform on 19 October 2019, whereas the second and last season was released on 19 November 2021.

Premise 
The fiction follows three women in their thirties: Cris, Esther and María, facing different life situations and eventually coming to rethink their pre-established ideas.

Cast 
Leads
 Celia Freijeiro as Cris
 Leticia Dolera as María
  as Esther
Other

Production and release 
Created by Leticia Dolera, the series was written by Dolera together with Manuel Burque, whereas it was directed by Dolera together with Ginesta Guindal and Elena Martín. It was co-produced by Movistar+ and Corte y Confección de Películas. The decision to remove actress Aina Clotet from the cast due to her pregnancy generated controversy and public scrutiny.

The first season, consisting of 8 episodes with a running time of about 25 minutes was fully released on Movistar+ on 18 October 2019. The production of a second season was subsequently announced in December 2019. In January 2021, HBO Max reached an agreement with Movistar+ to release the first season in the United States as well as to join the set of production companies of season 2, whose filming had ended by that time.

The first episode of season 2 was presented at the Iberseries Platino Industria festival in September 2021. The release date for the full final season (19 November 2021) was also announced.

Awards and nominations

References 

2019 Spanish television series debuts
Television shows set in Barcelona
Movistar+ original programming
Spanish-language television shows
2010s comedy-drama television series
2020s Spanish comedy television series
2020s Spanish drama television series
Spanish comedy-drama television series